The 1968–69 European Cup was the fourth edition of the European Cup, IIHF's premier European club ice hockey tournament. The season started on September 17, 1968 and finished on October 12, 1969.

The tournament was won by CSKA Moscow, who beat EC KAC in the final

First round

 EV Füssen, 
 Dukla Jihlava   :  bye

Second round

Third round

 ZKL Brno,   
 CSKA Moscow  :  bye

Semifinals

Finals

References 
 Season 1969

1
IIHF European Cup